Live at Newport is a live album by American jazz trumpeter Christian Scott released in 2008 via Concord Records label.

Reception
Josef Woodard of JazzTimes noted "From one perspective, it might seem a bit premature for young trumpeter Christian Scott to be releasing a live album, with only two major label studio albums out since his emergence on the scene in 2006. On the plus side, Live at Newport, with material drawn from his earlier albums mixed in with new tunes, offers up a glimpse at Scott's intriguing and evolving band in the more open and in-the-moment setting of a live show, and captured at a historic festival, no less... As a trumpeter, Scott demonstrates an appreciation for musical finery. Though a strong player, he heeds a romantic impulse and resists excessive technical overkill. He savors long, nuanced tones, loops fragmented phrases and generally seeks to hone a voice to call his own in the crowded ranks of good trumpeters on the scene. So far, so good, whatever his place in the genre game."

S. Victor Aaron of Something Else Reviews wrote "It's hard to escape the comparison of this date to Miles Davis’ historic performance at this same Newport festival exactly fifty years prior. Although Scott's music and even his trumpet playing are (ahem) miles apart, I gather that as Davis did back then, Scott and his band are turning heads with his Newport appearance, too. New Orleans was always known for raising forward-thinking jazz musicians. Christian Scott offers proof that this proud tradition is alive and well."

Track listing
All tracks are written by Christian Scott unless otherwise indicated.  The album includes elements of "Straight, No Chaser", written by Thelonious Monk.

CD
 Died in Love (6:56)
 Litany Against Fear (11:26)
 Isadora (5:09)
 Rumor (14:00), written by Matthew Stevens
 Anthem (9:13)
 The Crawler (6:50), written by Matthew Stevens
 James Crow Jr., Esq. (10:58), written with Louis Fouche
 Rewind That (9:07)

DVD
 Died in Love
 Litany Against Fear
 Isadora
 Rumor
 Anthem
 James Crow Jr., Esq.
 Rewind That

All access documentary "The Newport Experience".

Personnel
 Christian Scott – trumpet
 Walter Smith III – tenor saxophone (CD tracks 2, 4, 5–8)
 Matthew Stevens – guitar
 Aaron Parks – piano
 Joe Sanders – bass
 Jamire Williams – drums

Chart performance

References

2008 albums
Christian Scott albums
Concord Records live albums
Albums produced by Chris Dunn